The men's 100 metres event at the 2014 African Championships in Athletics was held August 10–11 on Stade de Marrakech.

Medalists

Results

Heats
Qualification: First 3 of each heat (Q) and the next 3 fastest (q) qualified for the semifinals.

Wind: Heat 1: -0.3 m/s, Heat 2: -0.6 m/s, Heat 3: -0.7 m/s, Heat 4: -1.1 m/s, Heat 5: -0.4 m/s, Heat 6: -1.3 m/s, Heat 7: +0.6 m/s

Semifinals
Qualification: First 2 of each semifinal (Q) and the next 2 fastest (q) qualified for the final.

Wind: Heat 1: -1.2 m/s, Heat 2: +1.6 m/s, Heat 3: -0.2 m/s

Final
Wind: +0.4 m/s

References

2014 African Championships in Athletics
100 metres at the African Championships in Athletics